The Boxing Tournament at the 2006 Central American and Caribbean Games was held in Cartagena, Colombia from July 20 to July 27.

Medal winners

External links
Results on Amateur Boxing

C
C
C